X-ray magnetic circular dichroism (XMCD) is a difference spectrum of two X-ray absorption spectra (XAS) taken in a magnetic field, one taken with left circularly polarized light, and one with right circularly polarized light. By closely analyzing the difference in the XMCD spectrum, information can be obtained on the magnetic properties of the atom, such as its spin and orbital magnetic moment. Using XMCD magnetic moments below 10−5 µB can be observed.

In the case of transition metals such as iron, cobalt, and nickel, the absorption spectra for XMCD are usually measured at the L-edge. This corresponds to the process in the iron case: with iron, a 2p electron is excited to a 3d state by an X-ray of about 700 eV. Because the 3d electron states are the origin of the magnetic properties of the elements, the spectra contain information on the magnetic properties. In rare-earth elements usually, the M4,5-edges are measured, corresponding to electron excitations from a 3d state to mostly 4f states.

See also
Magnetic circular dichroism
Faraday effect
EMCD
Transition metals
Magnetic field

References

X-ray spectroscopy